Retinol-binding protein 2 (RBP2) is a protein that in humans is encoded by the RBP2 gene.

Function 

RBP2 is an abundant protein present in the small intestinal epithelium. It is thought to participate in the uptake and/or intracellular metabolism of vitamin A. Vitamin A is a fat-soluble vitamin necessary for growth, reproduction, differentiation of epithelial tissues, and vision. RBP2 may also modulate the supply of retinoic acid to the nuclei of endometrial cells during the menstrual cycle.

References

Further reading

External links 
 PDBe-KB provides an overview of all the structure information available in the PDB for Human Retinol-binding protein 2 (RBP2)

Lipocalins